Khachpar is a village in the Masis Municipality of the Ararat Province of Armenia. The village was populated by Azerbaijanis before the exodus of Azerbaijanis from Armenia after the outbreak of the Nagorno-Karabakh conflict. In 1988-1989 Armenian refugees from Azerbaijan settled in the village.

References

External links 
 
 World Gazetteer: Armenia – World-Gazetteer.com
 

Populated places in Ararat Province